The Chief of Combined Staff of the Unified Armed Forces of the Warsaw Treaty Organization was a post in command of Combined Staff of the military forces of the Warsaw Pact. Furthermore, the Chief of Combined Staff was also a First Deputy Chief of the General Staff of the Armed Forces of the Soviet Union. The post, which was instituted in 1955 and abolished in 1991, was always held by a Soviet officer.

List of officeholders

See also
 Deputy Supreme Allied Commander Europe – NATO counterpart
 Supreme Commander of the Unified Armed Forces of the Warsaw Treaty Organization

Notes

References

Warsaw Pact